CKFI-FM is a Canadian radio station licensed to Swift Current, Saskatchewan, serving the southwestern Saskatchewan area broadcasting at 97.1 FM with a hot adult contemporary format branded as Magic 97.

The station is currently owned and operated by Golden West Broadcasting which also sister stations CKSW and CIMG-FM.

The station received approval by the CRTC on February 3, 2005 and began broadcasting later that year. CKFI's studios are located at 134 Central Avenue North in Swift Current, Saskatchewan. In November 2016, the station moved to the top floor of the Innovation Credit Union Building.

References

External links
Magic 97
 

Kfi
Kfi
Kfi
Kfi
Radio stations established in 2005
2005 establishments in Saskatchewan